Hinaleimoana Kwai Kong Wong-Kalu, (born May 15, 1972) also known as Kumu Hina, is a Native Hawaiian māhū – a traditional third gender person who occupies "a place in the middle" between male and female, as well as a modern transgender woman. She is known for her work as a kumu hula ("hula teacher"), as a filmmaker, artist, activist and as a community leader in the field of Kanaka Maoli language and cultural preservation. She teaches Kanaka Maoli philosophy and traditions that promotes cross-cultural alliances throughout the Pacific Islands. Kumu Hina is known as a "powerful performer with a clear, strong voice"; she has been hailed as "a cultural icon".

Early life and education
Wong-Kalu was born on May 15, 1972 in the Nuʻuanu district of Oʻahu. Her mother is of English, Hawaiian, and Portuguese descent and her father is of Chinese descent. She is the youngest of four siblings. She attended Kamehameha School (1990) and the University of Hawaiʻi at Mānoa (1996–2004) where she began her activism.

Career
Wong-Kalu was a founder of the Kulia Na Mamo transgender health project and cultural director of a Hawaiian public charter school. She was also a former Hawaiian language kumu at Leeward Community College. A candidate for the Office of Hawaiian Affairs, she was one of the first transgender candidates for statewide political office in the United States. She also served as the Chair of the Oʻahu Island Burial Council, which oversees the management of Native Hawaiian burial sites and ancestral remains. 

Wong-Kalu was the subject of the feature documentary film Kumu Hina, directed by Dean Hamer and Joe Wilson. Kumu Hina premiered as the closing night film in the Hawaii International Film Festival in 2014 and won several awards including best documentary at the Frameline Film Festival and the GLAAD Media Award for Outstanding Documentary. It was nationally broadcast on PBS in 2015 where it won the Independent Lens Audience Award. In 2022, Wong-Kalu was one of the curators for a Bishop Museum exhibit on the Waikīkī’s Healer Stones of Kapaemahu.

Filmmaker
Subsequent to the release of Kumu Hina, Wong-Kalu wrote an educational children's version of the film, A Place in the Middle, which premiered at the Berlin International Film Festival and Toronto International Film Festival for Kids and is featured on PBS learning media.

Wong-Kalu, along with filmmaker Dean Hammer and director Joe Wilson produced the short film, Lady Eva and feature documentary Leitis in Waiting about the struggle of the Indigenous transgender community in the South Pacific Kingdom of Tonga. Both films screened and won awards at AFI Docs and the LA, Margaret Mead, FIFO and Festival of Commonwealth Film and were broadcast on PBS/Pacific Heartbeat, ARTE, Maori TV, TV France and NITV. Since the production of Leitis in Waiting, the film co-directed by Kumu Hina has recently been granted the GLAAD Media Award, which accurately portrays issues among LGBTQI+ communities globally.

In 2020, Wong-Kalu directed, produced and narrated Kapaemahu, an animated short film based on the Hawaiian story of four legendary māhū who brought the healing arts from Tahiti to Hawai'i and imbued their powers on giant boulders that still stand on Waikiki Beach after the introduction of U.S. government and tourism. Narrated in the rare Niihau dialect of Hawaiian, the film premiered at the Tribeca Film Festival and for the Grand Jury Award which qualified for the Oscars at Animayo in 2020.

Awards and honors
She is a recipient of the National Education Association Ellison Onizuka Human and Civil Rights Award, Native Hawaiian Community Educator of the year, and a White House Champion of Change. USA Today named Wong-Kalu one of ten Women of the Century from Hawai'i Wong-Kalu is also featured in Naomi Hirahara's 2022 anthology We Are Here: 30 Inspiring Asian Americans and Pacific Islanders Who Have Shaped the United States that was published by the Smithsonian Institution and Running Press Kids.

Personal life 
Wong-Kalu is married to Haemaccelo Kalu, a native of Tonga.

Filmography
 Lady Eva
 Leitis in Waiting
 A Place in the Middle
 Kapaemahu (2020)

See also
List of people with non-binary gender identities

References

External links
Kumu Hina - Main website
A Place in the Middle - Kids' version
Kapaemahu - animated short

1972 births
Living people
LGBT Native Hawaiians
American LGBT rights activists
Hawaii people of Chinese descent
Native Hawaiian activists
Kamehameha Schools alumni
University of Hawaiʻi at Mānoa alumni
Transgender women
American transgender people
LGBT people from Hawaii
Transgender dancers
American filmmakers